Yavuz Yolcu (born 1 January 1966) is a Turkish judoka. He competed in the men's half-lightweight event at the 1988 Summer Olympics.

References

1966 births
Living people
Turkish male judoka
Olympic judoka of Turkey
Judoka at the 1988 Summer Olympics
Place of birth missing (living people)
20th-century Turkish people